Blowback is a 2000 thriller film directed by Mark L. Lester and starring Mario Van Peebles and James Remar.

Premise
The film follows detective Morrell (Van Peebles) as he investigates whether a series of murders identical to those committed by Wittman (Remar) years ago were committed by a copycat or if they were committed by Wittman himself.

Cast
 Mario Van Peebles as Inspector Don Morrell
 James Remar as Wittman
 David Groh as Capt. Barnett
 Stephen Caffrey as Agent Norwood

Production
Filming took place in San Diego, California.

References

External links

2000 films
American thriller films
Films directed by Mark L. Lester
Films scored by Sean Callery
2000 thriller films
2000s English-language films
2000s American films